Arcor is the former name of the fixed phone line and Internet business of Vodafone D2 GmbH, a German subsidiary of telecommunications company Vodafone. It is the second-largest provider of fixed phone lines in Germany after Deutsche Telekom. Its name changed on 1 August 2009 after Vodafone completed acquisition of the company. 
Its headquarters were in Eschborn near Frankfurt. It is one of the few telecommunications companies in Germany to operate an ISDN network that is independent of the incumbent provider Deutsche Telekom.

In 2008 Vodafone Germany had 2.1 million ADSL customers and 1.1 million ISDN customers. Arcor was the first German telecommunications provider to offer a flat rate tariff for ISDN phone lines.

History
Mannesmann Arcor AG & Co. KG was formed in 1996 as a joint venture between Mannesmann, Deutsche Bank and DBKom, a subsidiary of Deutsche Bahn, the national railway operator. After Mannesmann was bought out by Vodafone the company was renamed  Arcor AG & Co. KG.

On 19 May 2008, Vodafone acquired the minority shareholdings of Deutsche Bahn and Deutsche Bank (18.17% and 8.18% respectively) to gain full control of Arcor.

Censorship controversy
In September 2007 various computer magazines reported that Arcor was blocking access to a small number of pornography sites such as YouPorn for their domestic Internet users. Technology news website Heise Online reported that a competing Internet pornography business had advised Arcor that the blocked sites were illegal under German law as they had either no or inadequate measures to verify the age of people accessing their content.

References

External links
Company's Website

Telecommunications companies of Germany
Vodafone
German brands